Sajeev Koshy (born 1956 in Trivandrum, Kerala died 2023) was an Indian-born specialist endodontist currently residing in Australia. He was a public dentist, clinical director and a social advocate. He was a recipient of The Medal of the Order of Australia (OAM).

Education 
Koshy completed his schooling from St Joseph's High School, and graduated from Mar Ivanios College, Trivandrum, Kerala, India. He completed his Bachelor of Dental Surgery degree from Kerala University, Trivandrum, and was the President of the Kerala Dental Students Association in 1978.

He has an MDS in Endodontics, an MBA from the University of Otago, New Zealand, and an MRACDS (Endo) conferred by the Royal Australian College of Dental Surgeons. He is a graduate of the Australian Institute of Company Directors. Koshy also has an academic title with Griffith University.

Career
From 1995 to 1996, Koshy was the President of the Indian Dental Association Kerala. Koshy also served as the president of Kerala Dental Council, the statutory body for dental registration and regulation in the State of Kerala, with more than 20,000 registered dentists. He was first elected as a council member and after three years, was elected as the Chairman of the Council consecutively for three five-year terms. He resigned in 1998 when he emigrated to New Zealand. He is the head of Endodontics, Prosthodontics, Implantology, periodontics and Specialist Endodontist at the Royal Dental Hospital Melbourne, Australia, the tertiary teaching hospital in Victoria. Until March 2018, he served as the Clinical Director (Dental) of Plenty Valley Community Health. Dr Koshy also assists the rural health services in Victoria by working as Director of Dental Services for Boort District Health and for SwanHill District Health Services . Koshy also works as Clinical Adviser -Dental to the recently amalgamated new Central Highland Rural Health at Hepburn.

Philanthropy 
Koshy has worked to assist refugees and asylum seekers with oral health care in Victoria. He has also worked abroad as a Rotary International dental volunteer with the UNHCR program in Hong Kong for Vietnamese refugees, and Rotary programs with Kikuyu tribes in Kenya, Q'eqchi' Indians in Guatemala, and orphans in Colima, Mexico. 
He is now the clinical advisor for Smile High Foundation which volunteers in Nepal.He is a former member of the Gippsland Dental Task Force Group, facilitated by Dental Health Services Victoria, which drafted the first Gippsland Oral Health Plan in 2008.
He was Chair of the North and West Metro Oral Health leadership group for Victoria, and former Board Chair and Director of Platinum Cove Pty Ltd, which is trading as Northern Dental Centre.

Awards and recognition
 Appointed by the Victorian Minister for Suburban Development to the Northern Metropolitan partnership as a board member 
Knight of the Order of St John Knights Hospitaller with the title of Chevalier −2021
Winner of Times NOW & ICICI Bank NRI of the Year Awards 2018 ( Professional Category)
Recipient Australia Day Awards 2016 – The Medal of the Order of Australia (OAM)
 Appointed by the COAG Ministerial Health Council to the AHPRA National Scheme – Dental Board of Australia since August 2015
 Appointed by the Victorian Health Minister to the Victorian Clinical Council
 Recipient of Victoria's MultiCultural Awards for Excellence in 2012
 Recipient of Victoria's first public oral health care awards in 2010
 Recipient of the 2008 Dentistry Achievement Award of the Australian Dental Association, Victoria
Winner of the Victorian Health Care Award for the Best Health Care Team in Victoria, 2007

References 

Recipients of the Medal of the Order of Australia
Australian people of Indian descent
Indian dentists
Living people
Australian people of Malayali descent
1956 births